Bonus is a 1975 Soviet drama film directed by Sergey Mikaelyan. The film is based on the novel of the same name by Alexander Gelman.

Plot
At a meeting of the Communist Party committee of a construction trust, one of the supervisors, Potapov, makes a surprise announcement. He and his team refuse to receive the bonus money issued for overfulfillment of plan targets. According to Potapov, the management of the trust regularly artificially lowers targets so that the trust can easily exceed its targets. Potapov proves his words with compelling economic data.

The director of the trust, Batarcev, dismisses his allegations. He tries to disparage Potapov as a "troublemaker" and attempts to cover up the scandal. However, the Party Secretary unexpectedly supports Potapov's initiative ...

Cast
 Yevgeny Leonov as Vasilij Potapov, Supervisor
 Vladimir Samoilov as Pavel   Batarcev, Trust Director
 Oleg Yankovsky as Lev  . Solomahin, local Communist Party Secretary
 Mikhail Gluzsky as Boris  Shatunov, Head of the Planning Department
 Armen Dzhigarkhanyan as Grigorij   Frolovski, Chief Manager
 Leonid D'jachkov as Viktor   Chernikov, Head of the Construction Department
 Aleksandr Pashutin as Oleg   Kachnov, Supervisor
 Viktor Sergachjov as Roman   Lyubaev, Safety Engineer
 Boryslav Brondukov as Aleksandr   Zyubin, Foreman
 Svetlana Kryuchkova as Aleksandra Mikhajlovna, Crane Driver
 Mikhail Semyonov as Anatolij Zharikov, Secretary of the local Komsomol branch
 Nina Urgant as Dina   Milenina, Economist

Awards 
 Grand prix of All-Union Film Festival (1975)
 Critics Award International Film Festival "Man-Work-Creation" in Poland (1975)
 USSR State Prize (1976)
 Gold Medal at the Avellino International Film Festival (Laceno d'oro - Festival del cinema neorealistico) (1976)
 Award at the Karlovy Vary International Film Festival (1976)
 Honorary award and diploma Barcelona International Film Festival (1976)
 Award at the Chicago International Film Festival (1976)

References

External links

1975 drama films
1975 films
Soviet drama films
Films directed by Sergei Mikaelyan